Windsor station is a historic railroad station on Amtrak's New Haven–Springfield Line, located in downtown Windsor, Connecticut. It is served by Amtrak  and  intercity service and CT Rail's Hartford Line commuter rail service. The nearby Hartford & New Haven Railroad-Freight Depot serves as the home of the Windsor Arts Center.

History

Windsor Station was originally built in 1870 as the  Hartford & New Haven Railroad Depot and rebuilt to its original Victorian architecture by Town of Windsor, Amtrak and the Greater Hartford Transit District in 1988, the same year it was listed on the National Register of Historic Places. 

In February 2017, the state announced an additional $50 million in funds, including money to complete design of the rebuilt Windsor station. Design will be completed by 2020; the platforms will be moved slightly, and a parking deck built nearby.

Hartford Line commuter service commenced on June 16, 2018. A second low-level platform was opened on September 14, 2018, and the track one platform was temporarily closed until September 24 for track work.

The Connecticut Department of Transportation has proposed that the existing historic station be moved to a new site approximately 500 feet to the south of the existing station. If this occurs the existing station would be expanded to include high-level platforms on both sides of the tracks, as well as the installation of elevators, stairways, an overhead pedestrian bridge to cross the tracks.

See also
National Register of Historic Places listings in Windsor, Connecticut
Wallingford, Connecticut, Amtrak station – a station with a similar design

References

Further reading

External links 

Windsor – Hartford Line
Windsor Amtrak Station (USA Rail Guide -- Train Web)

Windsor, Connecticut
Amtrak stations in Connecticut
Stations on the New Haven–Springfield Line
Historic American Engineering Record in Connecticut
Stations along New York, New Haven and Hartford Railroad lines
Railway stations on the National Register of Historic Places in Connecticut
Railway stations in Hartford County, Connecticut
National Register of Historic Places in Hartford County, Connecticut
Second Empire architecture in Connecticut
Railway stations in the United States opened in 1870
Historic district contributing properties in Connecticut